Nathan Lord (November 28, 1793 – September 9, 1870) was an American Congregational clergyman and educator who served as president of Dartmouth College for more than three decades.

Biography
Nathan Lord was born in Berwick, Maine. He graduated from Bowdoin College in 1809, and attended Andover Theological Seminary, serving afterwards as a pastor at the Congregationalist Church in Amherst, Massachusetts for twelve years.

In 1828 he became the sixth president of Dartmouth College serving in this capacity from 1828 to 1863. Lord was able to bring the college out of debt, improve the overall curriculum, and raise admission levels.

He was a founding member of the American Anti-Slavery Society, and in 1833 became its vice president. He admitted black students to Dartmouth College and was a friend of William Lloyd Garrison. However, after Garrison challenged the Bible on its alleged endorsement of slavery, deeply religious Lord ceased his support of the abolitionist movement and its cause.

His views on slavery changed dramatically; he came to see it as "not a moral evil", but as a blessing, "an ordinance of...God", which "providentially found a settlement in this country". These views, and his opposition to the Civil War, which he blamed on abolitionists, brought a storm of controversy, earning him the enmity of several members of the Dartmouth Board of Trustees, including Amos Tuck (1835), a founding member of the Republican Party and close friend of Abraham Lincoln.

Matters came to a head in 1863 when the Trustees were deadlocked on awarding an honorary degree to President Lincoln, and Lord broke the tie by voting against it. The Trustees issued a statement: "Neither the trustees nor the Faculty coincide with the president of the College in the views which he has published, touching slavery and the war; and it has been our hope that the College would not be judged a partisan institution by reason of such publications." Lord, 70, tendered his resignation.

He continued as an active member of the Dartmouth College community in Hanover, New Hampshire, until his death in 1870.

Family
He married Elizabeth King Leland (1792-1870) and they had ten children; his youngest son, Nathan Lord Jr., (1831-1885), was a colonel of the 6th Regiment of Vermont Volunteers in the Civil War.

References

Further reading
 
 The Wheelock Succession of Dartmouth Presidents

External links
 
 Nathan Lord, President, 1828-1863

1792 births
1870 deaths
Bowdoin College alumni
Presidents of Dartmouth College
People of New Hampshire in the American Civil War
American proslavery activists
American Anti-Slavery Society
People from Berwick, Maine